The 1997 CAF Champions League Final is the final of the 1997 CAF Champions League, the 33rd edition of Africa's premier club football tournament organized by the Confederation of African Football (CAF), and the 1st edition under the current CAF Champions League format.

The final is contested in two-legged home-and-away format between Obuasi Goldfields SC of Ghana and Raja CA Casablanca of Morocco. The first leg was hosted by Obuasi Goldfields SC at the Baba Yara Stadium in Obuasi on 30 November 1997, while the second leg was hosted by Raja CA Casablanca at the Stade Mohamed V in Casablanca on 14 December 1997. Raja CA Casablanca won on penalties shootout and it earns the right to play in the 1998 CAF Super Cup against the winner of the 1997 African Cup Winners' Cup.

Qualified teams
In the following table, finals until 1996 were in the African Cup of Champions Club era, since 1997 were in the CAF Champions League era.

Venues

Len Clay Stadium

Len Clay Stadium is a multi-use stadium in Obuasi, Ghana. It was opened on 10 May 1990 by the former president of Ghana, Jerry Rawlings. It is home to Ashanti Gold Sporting Club. It has capacity for 20,000 people. The stadium is dedicated to Len Clay, a former Group Engineering and Projects Manager of Ashanti Goldfield Company and supporter of the team.

The stadium was Built under the direct project supervision Of Engineer and Builder J.A.W Cole, who also built the Enyinam Housing Project and Enyinam lodge amongst others and different projects under S.C.C across Ghana.

Mohamed V Stadium

Mohammed V Stadium is part of a big athletic complex situated in the heart of the city of Casablanca, Morocco, in the western part of the Maarif neighborhood. It was inaugurated March 6, 1955, and currently has a capacity of 67,000.

Often hosting the games of the Morocco national football team, the Mohammed V Stadium is equally known as the home of Wydad AC and Raja CA. It is named after King Mohammed V of Morocco.

Mohammed V Stadium is located right in the centre of the city of Casablanca, the international airport of Casablanca is 25 kilometres from the stadium, and the Casa-Voyageurs rail station is 5 kilometres from the stadium. The stadium has a parking lot with a capacity of 1,000 cars.

It currently has a semi-artificial lawn of a high standard.

Road to final

Format
The final was decided over two legs, with aggregate goals used to determine the winner. If the sides were level on aggregate after the second leg, the away goals rule would have been applied, and if still level, the tie would have proceeded directly to a penalty shootout (no extra time is played).

Matches

First leg

Second leg

References

External links
Champions' League 1997 - Rec.Sport.Soccer Statistics Foundation

1997
Final
Raja CA matches
1997–98 in Moroccan football
1997–98 in Ghanaian football
November 1997 sports events in Africa
December 1997 sports events in Africa
Caf Champions League Final 1997